WQEK-LD (channel 36) is a low-power television station in Clarksdale, Mississippi, United States. The station is owned by DTV America Corporation of Sunrise, Florida.

WQEK's low-power signal does not actually reach Clarksdale, and it instead serves the inner core of the Memphis, Tennessee market, though unlike sister station KPMF-LD (which is licensed to Paragould, Arkansas, a city in the Jonesboro market), Clarksdale is fully within the Memphis market. WQEK-LD and KPMF-LD's transmitters are co-located on the Tegna tower near Brunswick, Tennessee, in northern Shelby County.

History 
The station's construction permit was granted by the Federal Communications Commission for the station as W18EK-D on October 2, 2012. Its call letters were changed to the current WQEK-LD on December 7, 2015. WQEK-LD finally took to the air in September 2016 as a Cozi TV affiliate. A total of eight subchannels were launched in its first months on the air, offering multiple digital networks.

Technical information

Subchannels 
The station's digital signal is multiplexed:

References

External links
HC2 Holdings

 
 

QEK-LD
Innovate Corp.
Decades (TV network) affiliates
Movies! affiliates
TBD (TV network) affiliates
True Crime Network affiliates
Television channels and stations established in 2016
Low-power television stations in the United States
2016 establishments in Mississippi